Tony Grimaldi (born 21 November 1974) is an Australian former professional rugby league footballer who played in the 1990s and 2000s. He played for the Canterbury-Bankstown Bulldogs in the NRL. Grimaldi's career spanned over 12 seasons primarily for Canterbury-Bankstown.  He played at second-row forward in the 1998 NRL grand final against the Brisbane Broncos (scoring a try), as well as the 2004 NRL grand final for Canterbury-Bankstown against cross-town rivals, the Sydney Roosters.

Playing career
He played his junior rugby league primarily as a halfback and hooker for Penshurst RSL JRLFC. He played his first game in first grade in Round 21 1995 for the St. George Dragons against the North Queensland Cowboys. The first try he ever scored came after four seasons. It was for Canterbury-Bankstown in the 1998 NRL Grand Final.

Grimaldi also played briefly with Gateshead Thunder and Hull F.C. in the Super League competition. Tony Captained Hull F.C., due to his extensive experience in rugby league, to a final series.

He then returned to the Canterbury-Bankstown Bulldogs in the 2002 season. He was not a regular first grade player over the 2002-2003 seasons, however he worked his way back to a starting position.

Grimaldi was criticised for comments made in a press interview regarding Andrew Johns. Grimaldi was quoted as saying "I think you should be able to swear at the touchie if the decision's wrong."  He later withdrew his comments attributing them to a "poor attempt at sarcastic humour." . In his player profile, when asked what his most memorable moment from his début was he replied: "I've had so many knocks to the head that I don't even remember what I had for breakfast." . Teammate Brent Sherwin cited Grimaldi as the team's biggest pest as "He once put chillies on a sandwich he bought for me.". This comedic approach differed greatly from that of his serious, professional, onfield attitude

He is remembered as, "One of the club's workhorses, ... rock solid in defence and a sound attacker. ". In his last season of first grade at almost 32yrs of age he still averaged over 40 tackles per game an amazing achievement considering the physically demanding nature of rugby. He featured in the premiership winning side of 2004 for Canterbury-Bankstown. In 2005 despite not making the finals Grimaldi was the NRL top tackler "In 2005 he was the NRL leading tackler with 852 tackles and many will remember his one-on-one steal against Broncos Karmichael Hunt back in round 20 as Canterbury got home with a 29-22 victory."

He captained the side on a number occasions when representative players were unavailable. As 2004 NRL premiers, the Canterbury-Bankstown Bulldogs faced Super League IX champions, the Leeds Rhinos in the 2005 World Club Challenge. Grimaldi captained the Bulldogs at lock forward, scoring a try in their 32-39 loss. Grimaldi's loyalty and long standing service to the club was rewarded with a job within the Canterbury administration.

He was also of Italian descent and was eligible to represent the Italy national rugby league team.

He was forced to announce his retirement from rugby league on 14 September 2006. This was due to a bulging disk in his neck causing extreme pain in his neck and down along his right arm. He had previously had two vertebrae fused exacerbating his injury and increasing the chance of permanently injurying his neck if he continued to play.

Matches played

Footnotes

External links
 Tony Grimaldi's playing profile and statistics
 Official Tony Grimaldi NRL profile
 an article on Tony's career and retirement
 Article on Grimaldi's early retirement
 Grimaldi captain of Bulldogs for WCC match

1974 births
Living people
Australian people of Italian descent
Australian rugby league players
Australian expatriate sportspeople in England
Canterbury-Bankstown Bulldogs players
Gateshead Thunder (1999) players
Hull F.C. captains
Hull F.C. players
Rugby league locks
Rugby league hookers
Rugby league second-rows
Rugby league players from Sydney
St. George Dragons players